A transborder agglomeration is an urban agglomeration or conurbation that extends into multiple sovereign states and/or dependent territories. It includes city-states that agglomerate with their neighbouring countries.

List of transborder agglomerations

Africa

Asia

Europe

North America

South America

See also
 Border town
 Cross-border town naming
 List of divided cities
 Metropolitan area

References